Holochroa is a monotypic moth genus in the family Geometridae. Its only species, Holochroa dissociarius, is found in North America. The species was described by George Duryea Hulst in 1887 and he described the genus nine years later in 1896.

Subspecies
There are two subspecies:
 Holochroa dissociarius dissociarius g
 Holochroa dissociarius varia Rindge, 1961 c g b
Data sources: i = ITIS, c = Catalogue of Life, g = GBIF, b = BugGuide

References

Further reading

 
 
 
 
 
 
 
 
 

Nacophorini
Articles created by Qbugbot
Moths described in 1887
Monotypic moth genera